Jeanne-Marie de Maille (14 April 1331 − 28 March 1414) was a French Roman Catholic and a member from the Third Order of Saint Francis. Maille was born to nobles and married a nobleman herself though remained childless since she decided to remain chaste with spousal permission. The pair lived together until her husband died during a conflict and she became a Franciscan to dedicate herself to the care of the poor and ill since she had lost all with the death of her husband.

Pope Pius IX confirmed her beatification on 27 April 1871.

Life
Jeanne de Maille was born on 14 April 1331 as the last of three children to Hardouin I de Maille (1285-1340) and Jeanne de Montbazon (c. 1305-53) in Saint-Quentin in the Kingdom of France at their castle of La Roche. Her elder siblings were Hardouin II (1330–81) and Isabeau (c. 1325-64). The Madonna inspired her as a child that led her to lead a pious childhood; her father died in 1340 and so she lived with her grandfather after this. Her additional name "Marie" was added to her birth name at her Confirmation due to her devotion to the Mother of God.

Her grandfather chose a man for her to wed: the baron Robert II. This was after she consented despite failing to secure her grandfather's permission for her to join a convent as a nun. Her grandfather died during the 1337 wedding itself and she decided to consecrate herself to God as a virgin as a result of this which her husband did not mind at all. Her husband was captured in a battle and she sold all of her possessions to draw up the 3000 florin ransom but her husband fled and returned home before she could send it to his captors.

Robert II died from injuries sustained in a battle between the French and the English on 21 January 1353 and she became a nurse to help the ill and poor despite losing all she had. Her in-laws were unkind to her and blamed her for her husband squandering his fortune for charitable ends and so deprived her of her widow's inheritance and cut ties with her. She first went to seek shelter at the home of an old servant of hers but the servant treated her with harshness when realizing she was poor; she went to reside with her mother but left when the latter tried to pressure her into finding another husband. She also had a vision of Saint Ivasian who told her that she should live in the world in a spirit of faith. Maille became a member of the Third Order of Saint Francis and in 1388 moved into a small room at a church in Tours. Maille was once in the church at Tours when a madwoman threw a stone at her that injured her back. Maille rallied from this but the scar never quite healed.

Maille died on 28 March 1414 and her remains were clothed in a Franciscan habit for her burial.

Beatification
Pope Pius IX beatified her on 27 April 1871 in Saint Peter's Basilica.

References

External links
Saints SQPN
Santi e Beati
Find A Grave

1331 births
1414 deaths
14th-century venerated Christians
14th-century French people
15th-century venerated Christians
15th-century French people
Beatifications by Pope Pius IX
French beatified people
People from Saint-Quentin, Aisne
Venerated Catholics
14th-century French women
15th-century French women